Boat Harbour is a suburb of the Port Stephens local government area in the Hunter Region of New South Wales, Australia. The main population centre of the suburb is the village also known as Boat Harbour. Both lie adjacent to the bay after which they were named. The traditional owners of the land are Worimi people. 

From the easternmost end of Ocean Parade in highest part of the suburb, adjacent to the Tomaree National Park at Morna Point, there are striking views of the coastline. On a clear day it is possible to follow the coast southwards to the horizon, well beyond Newcastle.

Boat Harbour is a sheltered, sandy bay. Kingsley Beach is just to the south and is popular with surfers.

Notes

References

Suburbs of Port Stephens Council
Towns in the Hunter Region
Bays of New South Wales